Bruce Edward Davis (born February 25, 1963) is a former American football wide receiver in the National Football League (NFL) who played for the Cleveland Browns. He played college football for the Baylor Bears.

References

1963 births
Living people
American football wide receivers
American football return specialists
Cleveland Browns players
Players of American football from Dallas
Baylor Bears football players